Lansky station crossover is a railway bridge across  Serdobolskaya Street in Saint Peterburg, Russia. On either side of it, on high embankments, there are the station platforms of Lanskaya railway station. The bridge was expanded in 1926.

Station access
The platform of Lanskaya station, from the Saint Petersburg  direction, is located on the embankment. Access to it is obtained from under the bridge.

Memoirs
The bridge is mentioned in the memoir "March of 1917" by the novelist Aleksandr Solzhenitsyn.

References 

Rail bridges in Saint Petersburg